Azéma (and variations like: Azem, Azemar) is a French surname. It derives from the pre 7th Century personal name "Aethelmaer", a compound of the elements "aethel", meaning noble, and "maer", which means famous. Notable people with the surname include:

Agénor Azéma de Montgravier (1805–1863), French archaeologist
Anne Azéma (born 1957), French-born soprano and artistic director of the Boston Camerata
Claude Azéma (1943–2021), French auxiliary bishop of Montpellier
Étienne Azéma (1776–1851), French poet, playwright, and writer of fables
Franck Azéma (born 1971), French rugby union
Georges Azéma (1821–1864), French historian from Réunion
Henri Azéma (1861–1932), physician, journalist, and author from Réunion
Jean-Baptiste Azéma (17th century-1745) colonial governor of Réunion
Jean-Henri Azéma (1913–2000), French poet, father of Jean-Pierre Azéma
Jean-Pierre Azéma (born 1937), French historian
Léon Azéma (1888–1978), French architect, employed as "Architect of the City of Paris"
 (born 1990), French actress
Mazaé Azéma (1823–1886), French politician and doctor, recipient of the Légion d'honneur
Sabine Azéma (born 1949), French movie actress and film director

See also 
 Azem (disambiguation)

References

French-language surnames